Tales of Mystery and Imagination is the second album by Swedish power metal band Nocturnal Rites, their first on Century Media. It received distribution in Europe in February 1998 after being initially released only in Japan.

In 2005, the album was re-issued as a two-disc compilation titled, Lost in Time: The Early Years of Nocturnal Rites. The compilation featured previously unreleased demos and acoustic re-recordings.

Track listing
"Ring of Steel" – 6:42
"Dark Secret" – 5:04
"Test of Time" – 5:01
"Lost in Time" – 3:01
"The Vision" - 4:21
"Warrior's Return" – 4:43
"Change the World" – 3:46
"Pentagram" – 3:48
"Eye of the Demon" – 4:42
"End of the World" – 3:24
"The Curse" – 4:03
"Burn in Hell" – 3:38
"Living for Today" (demo) – 4:36 (bonus track on the Japanese version)

2005 Re-issue bonus tracks
Living For Today (demo)
11 minutes "10th Anniversary" video enhancement

Personnel
Anders Zackrisson - lead and backing vocals
Fredrik Mannberg - guitar
Nils Norberg - lead and rhythm guitar, synth guitar and spacelizer
Nils Eriksson - bass
Ulf Andersson - drums

Additional musicians
Mattias Bernhardsson - Keyboards

References

1997 albums
Nocturnal Rites albums
Century Media Records albums